David Prentice (1936–2014) was an English artist and former art teacher.

David Prentice is also the name of:

David R. Prentice (born 1943), American artist

See also
David Prentiss (disambiguation)
Dave Prentis, trade unionist